Leonora A. Hohl (9 March 1909 – 30 June 1997) was a microbiologist from the College of Agriculture at the University of California, Berkeley. She was educated at the University of California and University of Michigan.  She returned to UC Berkeley for the vast majority of her professional life. She specialized in the study of sugar content and acid production of Saccharomyces cerevisiae.

Education
Hohl began her education at the University of California, receiving her B.A. in 1931.  She then matriculated to University of Michigan where she obtained her M.A. in 1934.  She returned to University of California to complete her doctoral education (1939).

Scientific career
Hohl's early work focused on the characterization of acids produced by S. cerevisiae during fermentation of sugar.  Later in her career, she worked on freezing preservation of fruits and vegetables with Maynard Jocelyn.

Selected publications

 M. A. Joslyn and Leonora A. Hohl. (1948). The commercial freezing of fruit products. California Agricultural Experiment Station Bulletin 703.

References

American microbiologists
Women microbiologists
1909 births
1997 deaths
University of California alumni
University of Michigan alumni
20th-century American women scientists
20th-century American scientists